Edgar Milcíades Aguilera Aranda (born 28 July 1975) is a retired Paraguayan footballer. He played either as a defender or midfielder.

Aguilera represented Paraguay at the 1998 FIFA World Cup. At the club level, he played mostly for Cerro Corá and played abroad for Cerro Porteño, Atlético Paranaense in Brazil, CSD Municipal in Guatemala and Blooming in Bolivia.

External links
 
Profile at Weltfussball.de

1975 births
Living people
Paraguayan footballers
Paraguay international footballers
Cerro Porteño players
1998 FIFA World Cup players
Association football defenders